The Bishop of Derry and Raphoe is the Church of Ireland Ordinary of the united Diocese of Derry and Raphoe in the Province of Armagh.

The united diocese has two Episcopal sees, one at St Columb's Cathedral, Derry in Northern Ireland, and the other at the Cathedral Church of St. Eunan, Raphoe in the Republic of Ireland. The current incumbent is Andrew Forster, formerly Archdeacon of Ardboe, who was elected on 29 August 2019, and consecrated on 8 December 2019.

List of bishops

References

External links
 Crockford's Clerical Directory - Listings

Lists of Anglican bishops and archbishops
Religion in County Londonderry
Religion in County Tyrone
Religion in County Donegal
Derry and Raphoe
Bishops of Derry and Raphoe